"Rich Sex" is a song by Trinidadian-born rapper Nicki Minaj featuring American rapper Lil Wayne. It was released as the first promotional single from Minaj's fourth studio album Queen (2018) on June 11, 2018, by Young Money Entertainment and Cash Money Records.

Release
Minaj released "Rich Sex" as the first promotional single on June 11 along with the announcement of her upcoming second single "Bed" featuring American singer Ariana Grande.

Live performances
Minaj first performed the song in a medley consisting of "Chun-Li" and "Rich Sex" at the BET Awards 2018 held on June 23.

Lawsuit
In January 2021, rapper and co-writer of the song Jawara Headley sued Minaj for more than $200 million over the track. Headley, professionally known as Brinx Billions, claimed he should be credited as the sole author, composer, writer and producer of "Rich Sex". In his legal filings, the writer alleged he first showed Minaj "Rich Sex" prior to 2016, when she said to him "it would be extremely marketable and become a global hit".

Credits and personnel
Credits adapted from Tidal.
Nicki Minaj – lead vocals
Lil Wayne – vocals
J. Reid – songwriting, production
Aubry "Big Juice" Delaine – songwriting, production, mixing engineering
Jawara Headley – songwriting
Jaycen Joshua – mixing
Manny Galvez – mixing engineering
Jeff Edwards – mixing engineering
Rashawn Mclean – assistant mixing
Mike Seaberg – assistant mixing
Jacob Richards – assistant mixing
Jason Delattiboudere – assistant engineering
Brian Judd – assistant engineering
Jamal Berry – assistant engineering

Charts

Release history

References

2018 singles
2018 songs
Nicki Minaj songs
Lil Wayne songs
Songs written by Nicki Minaj
Songs written by Lil Wayne
Republic Records singles
Cash Money Records singles
Young Money Entertainment singles
Trap music songs
Dirty rap songs